Secamone socotrana is a species of plant in the family Apocynaceae. It is endemic to the Socotra Islands in the Republic of Yemen.  Its natural habitats are subtropical or tropical dry forests and subtropical or tropical dry shrubland.

References

Endemic flora of Socotra
socotrana
Least concern plants
Plants described in 1884
Taxonomy articles created by Polbot
Taxa named by Isaac Bayley Balfour